Two human polls comprised the 1967 NCAA University Division football rankings. Unlike most sports, college football's governing body, the NCAA, does not bestow a national championship, instead that title is bestowed by one or more different polling agencies. There are two main weekly polls that begin in the preseason—the AP Poll and the Coaches Poll.

Legend

AP Poll
The final AP Poll was released in late November, at the end of the 1967 regular season. This was last time that the final poll was conducted before bowl season.

The AP ranked only the top ten teams from 1962 through 1967.

Final Coaches Poll
The final UPI Coaches Poll was released prior to the bowl games, in late November.USC received 27 of the 34 first-place votes; Tennessee received six and Oklahoma one.

Notre Dame did not participate in bowl games from 1925 through 1968.
 Prior to the 1975 season, the Big Ten and Pac-8 conferences allowed only one postseason participant each, for the Rose Bowl.
 The Ivy League has prohibited its members from participating in postseason football since the league was officially formed in 1954.

References

College football rankings